Ypsora is a genus of moths of the family Noctuidae.

Species
Ypsora homochroa (Dognin, 1914)
Ypsora lepraota Hampson, 1926
Ypsora santaris Schaus, 1901
Ypsora selenodes Hampson, 1926
Ypsora violascens Draudt and Gaede, 1944

References
Natural History Museum Lepidoptera genus database

Calpinae